Thomas Russell (1577–1632) was an English politician who sat in the House of Commons in 1601.

Russell was the son of Sir John Russell of Strensham. He matriculated at St John's College, Oxford on 5 November 1591, aged 14.  In 1601, he was elected Member of Parliament for Worcestershire. He was knighted on 11 May 1603. He was High Sheriff of Worcestershire in 1604. In 1610 he and his son  William were granted the office of Masters of the Game in Malvern Chase.

He is sometimes associated with the Thomas Russell who sat for Truro in 1614, but while the identity of this man is not clear, it is likely he was a different individual. Russell had become a recusant by this point, and would not have been re-elected to the Commons.

References

1577 births
1632 deaths
English MPs 1601
Members of the Parliament of England for Worcestershire